The Letten Tunnel is a disused railway tunnel in the Swiss city of Zürich. It is situated on the old route of the Lake Zürich right bank railway (Rechtsufrige Zürichseebahn) from Zurich Hbf station to Rapperswil station. Radical changes to the local railway geography led to the tunnel being superseded in 1990, and closed and sealed by 2002.

As built in 1894, the right bank railway was a single track line that departed from Zürich Hbf in a westerly direction, before performing a clockwise 270 degrees turn via a viaduct over the Limmat, the principal river flowing through the city of Zürich. It then passed through Letten station and the Letten Tunnel in order to reach Stadelhofen station.

In 1990 the Letten Tunnel was replaced by the Hirschengraben Tunnel, which took a direct route from new through low-level platforms at Zurich Hbf under the Limmat to Stadelhofen. After the new route opened, the original railway line and tunnel fell into disuse. The railway line was closed in 1998, and by 2002 it had been removed, and the tunnel was filled in and sealed off.

The northern portal of the tunnel can still be observed from a location close to the former Letten railway station and the Letten power station on the banks of the Limmat. The northern approaches to the tunnel, including the bridge over the Limmat, are now used as a cycle and pedestrian path.

References

External links
 

Transport in Zürich
Railway tunnels in Switzerland
Tunnels completed in 1894